Lovewell may refer to:

People:
Howard Lovewell Cheney (1889–1969), American architect and engineer
John Lovewell (1691–1725), militia captain, fought during Father Rale's War (also known as Lovewell's War)
Thomas Lovewell, early settler of Republic and Jewell counties in the Kansas Territory

Places:
Lovewell, Kansas, unincorporated community in Jewell County, Kansas, US
Lovewell Mountain, associated with the Sunapee Ridge in southwest New Hampshire, US
Lovewell State Park, in Jewell County, Kansas, US
Lovewell Pond, in southeastern Fryeburg, Maine, US
Lovewell Reservoir, in Jewell County, Kansas, US

Organizations:
Lovewell Institute for the Creative Arts, also known as Lovewell or Lovewell Institute, in Kansas, US

See also
The Generous Mr. Lovewell, the sixth studio album by Christian rock band MercyMe
Livewell
Lovell (disambiguation)
Lowell (disambiguation)